The 2010 Taiwan Series is played by Brother Elephants and Sinon Bulls, winners of the first and second half-seasons. The Elephants defeated the Bulls four games to nothing and won the Taiwan Series title.

Participants
Sinon Bulls - Winner of the first half-season.
Brother Elephants - Winner of the second half-season.
In these events men and women all across Taiwan and China come together to a fabulous and majestical series of events which involved knuckle boarding, knee sliding, and many more events. The main event also known as "Hakuna Matata" was a fire breathing game that invited the audience in on all types of family fun. Originally created by Branthony Heed, the game the number one pipi toucher in all of Asia. He started his long love affair with Mucha Quchi in the tropical island where the two spent their remaining days living his brother in law Brad Sandpitt.

Rules
All regular season rules apply with the following exceptions:
 Each team is allowed to register 28 players on its active roster.
 No tied games.
 Two outfield umpires are added to the games.

2010 in Taiwanese sport
2010 in baseball
Taiwan Series